Tyler Merren (born May 29, 1984) is an American goalball player. His visual impairment is caused by retinitis pigmentosa. He attended Wayland High School and went to Western Michigan University to study exercise science.

His wife Leanne is also blind. He competed for the bronze-medalist US team in Goalball at the 2004 Summer Paralympics. He also competed at the 2008 Summer Paralympics and the 2016 Summer Paralympics.

References

External links 
 
 

1984 births
Living people
Male goalball players
Paralympic goalball players of the United States
Paralympic silver medalists for the United States
Paralympic bronze medalists for the United States
Paralympic medalists in goalball
Goalball players at the 2004 Summer Paralympics
Goalball players at the 2008 Summer Paralympics
Goalball players at the 2016 Summer Paralympics
Medalists at the 2004 Summer Paralympics
Medalists at the 2016 Summer Paralympics
Medalists at the 2011 Parapan American Games
Western Michigan University alumni
Goalball players at the 2020 Summer Paralympics
People from Allegan, Michigan
Sportspeople from Michigan